The Czech Republic is a parliamentary representative democracy, with the president acting as head of state and the prime minister acting as head of government.

The first president of the Czech Republic was Václav Havel. The president is Petr Pavel, he was sworn into office on 9 March 2023.
Until 2012, the president was elected by the Chamber of Deputies and the Senate, for a term lasting five years. Since 2013 the president is elected by popular vote.

Presidents of the Czech Republic

 Parties

See also
List of rulers of Czechs
List of presidents of Czechoslovakia
List of prime ministers of Czechoslovakia
List of prime ministers of the Czech Socialist Republic
List of rulers of the Protectorate Bohemia and Moravia
List of prime ministers of the Czech Republic
Lists of incumbents

References

External links
The Czech constitution. Articles 54-66 are particularly relevant to the presidency.
The official site of Prague Castle

Czech Republic
Main
Presidents